The 1931 Central State Bearcats football team represented Central State Teachers College, later renamed Central Michigan University, as an independent during the 1931 college football season. In their first season under head coach George Van Bibber, the Bearcats compiled a 4–3 record (2–1 against MCC opponents), held five of seven opponents to seven or fewer point, and outscored all opponents by a combined total of 95 to 58. The team defeated its in-state rival Michigan State Normal (20–12), lost to rival Western State Teachers (6–7), and also lost to Big Ten Conference champion Michigan (0–27).

Van Bibber was named Central State's head football coach in May 1931. He replaced Butch Nowack who left Central State to accept a coaching position at Indiana. Van Bibber had played football, basketball, and baseball at Purdue.

Schedule

Game summaries

Michigan
Central State opened its 1931 season on October 3 with a 27-0 loss to Michigan.  The games attracted a crowd of nearly 80,000 at Michigan Stadium. Michigan played its backup players in the game. Michigan's touchdowns were scored by halfback Jack Heston (the son of former Michigan star Willie Heston), fullback Roderick Cox (1933 NCAA champion in the hammer throw), end Ted Petoskey, and substitute halfback Herbert Schmidt. Petoskey also kicked three points after touchdown.

References

Central State
Central Michigan Chippewas football seasons
Central State Bearcats football